Yangcheon-gu Office Station is a station on the Sinjeong Branch of the Seoul Subway Line 2. This station is located in Sinjeong-dong, Yangcheon-gu, Seoul. It is named after the city hall of Yangcheon-gu district; Yangcheon means "sunny stream".

Neighborhood
Seoul Metro Sinjeong Train Depot

References

Railway stations opened in 1992
Seoul Metropolitan Subway stations
Metro stations in Yangcheon District
1992 establishments in South Korea
20th-century architecture in South Korea